The Union of Democratic Mineworkers (UDM) was a British trade union for coal miners based in Nottinghamshire, England, established in 1985,  after the 1984–85 miners' strike, when the Nottinghamshire Area of the National Union of Mineworkers was involved in a number of disputes with the National Executive Committee that led to a split from the NUM.  In ballots on joining with Nottinghamshire in a new union, the South Derbyshire Area of the NUM voted in favour by 51% and the Colliery Workers and Allied Trades Association by almost 100%.

The Nottinghamshire Miners' Association initially remained within the National Union of Mineworkers with elected officers including Roy Lynk and Neil Greatrex, later the General Secretary of the UDM. Officials from the UDM advised ministers on how to cut miners' power – including by weakening the National Association of Colliery Overmen, Deputies and Shotfirers (NACODS).

The UDM was widely criticised in 2004 after it was revealed that its top two officials received pay and benefits of over £150,000 each, despite membership having fallen to 1,431. In 2012, former president Neil Greatrex was found guilty of fraud from a miners' welfare fund.

References

Breakaway trade unions
Mansfield
Mining trade unions
Mining in the United Kingdom
Trade unions based in Nottinghamshire
Trade unions in the United Kingdom